David Honeyford is an Alliance Party politician serving as a Member of the Northern Ireland Assembly (MLA) for  Lagan Valley since 2022.

Political party memberships 
Honeyford was formerly a member of NI21. which ceased to exist by 2016. He then joined the Alliance Party and became a member of its ruling Executive. He stepped down from that role in February 2017 after making comments, for which he later apologised, that unionists were "bred to hate" Catholics.

Political career

Early career 
In the May 2014 local elections to Lisburn and Castlereagh City Council, Honeyford was the NI21 candidate for the constituency of Killultagh. He placed last with 6.16% of First Preference Votes.

Councillor (2019-2022) 
Honeyford was first elected to Lisburn and Castlereagh City Council at the 2019 local elections for the Killultagh constituency. He topped the poll, with 20.3% of first preference votes and gained a seat for Alliance at the expense of the DUP's William Leathem.

Member of the Legislative Assembly (2022-) 
Honeyford was later elected as an MLA in the 2022 Northern Ireland Assembly election for Lagan Valley, alongside fellow Alliance Party candidate Sorcha Eastwood, after winning 4,183 First Preference Votes. He was elected on the 7th count, taking the constituency's final seat from the SDLP's Pat Catney by a margin of 644 votes - the seventh closest margin in Northern Ireland.

Personal life 
Honeyford works in construction and has been self-employed for 25 years.

As of May 2022, he is the Development Officer at Glenavy GAC, and was presented with the Club Member of the Year Award in 2018 and is an Irish and Ulster rugby fan.

References

External links 

Living people
Alliance Party of Northern Ireland MLAs
Northern Ireland MLAs 2022–2027
Year of birth missing (living people)
21st-century politicians from Northern Ireland